Same-sex marriage has been legal in Oaxaca since 5 October 2019. A landmark 2012 Supreme Court order for Oaxaca established the right to marriage by amparo across Mexico. In August 2019, the Congress of Oaxaca passed legislation amending various articles of the Civil Code to recognise same-sex marriages. The law went into force on 5 October. Previously, same-sex couples could marry in the state from August 2018 but required additional red tape compared to opposite-sex partners.

Legal history

2012 Supreme Court case and further legal challenges

In August 2011, three same-sex couples, four women and two men, applied to marry in Oaxaca City but were rejected by city officials. They sought an amparo, but it was denied on 31 January. The couples appealed the judgment to the Collegiate Courts in Civil and Administrative Matters for Oaxaca. On 9 April 2012, one of the lesbian couples was granted permission by a judge to marry, thus becoming the first approval for same-sex marriage in the state. The case was appealed. On 5 December 2012, the three couples won their appeal from the Mexican Supreme Court, but local officials refused to perform the marriages. The case returned to the Supreme Court and an additional ruling in favor of the couples was issued. The first lesbian couple received authorization to marry from the civil registry on 25 February 2013. They were the first same-sex couple to marry in Oaxaca, on 22 March 2013. The male couple received notice of their authorization on 3 June 2013, and the third couple two days later.

On 26 August 2012, a Mexican federal judge ordered the state of Oaxaca to perform same-sex marriages based on the Constitution of Mexico which bans discrimination on the grounds of sexual orientation. This ruling and two others were reviewed by the Mexican Supreme Court, which issued unanimous rulings on 5 December 2012, overturning the ban on same-sex marriage in three individual cases. To establish precedent, however, five individual cases must be decided this way. The 2012 Oaxaca case was pivotal in opening the door to legal same-sex marriage in every state in Mexico through the recurso de amparo remedy. Using international decisions, including Atala Riffo and Daughters v. Chile, the U.S. cases of Loving v. Virginia and Brown v. Board of Education, and Mexico's own anti-discrimination laws, the Supreme Court ruled on 5 December 2012 that laws limiting marriage to one man and one woman, or for the purposes of perpetuating the species, violate federal law requiring that they "correspond to all persons without any distinction", and that such laws are unconstitutional on the basis of discrimination by sexual orientation and usurpation of the right, not only of the individual but also the couple's right, to form a family. The court based its ruling on Articles 1 and 4 of the Constitution of Mexico. Article 1 of the Constitution states that "any form of discrimination, based on ethnic or national origin, gender, age, disabilities, social status, medical conditions, religion, opinions, sexual orientation, marital status, or any other form, which violates the human dignity or seeks to annul or diminish the rights and freedoms of the people, is prohibited.", and Article 4 relates to matrimonial equality, stating that "man and woman are equal under the law. The law shall protect the organization and development of the family." Barring legislative will to change state laws, a provision of Mexican law allows that five rulings in a state with the same outcome on the same issue override a statute and establish the legal jurisprudence to overturn it. Thus, marriages obtained by amparo can be performed in any state, regardless of whether the state civil code has been changed.

On 23 April 2014, the Mexican Supreme Court ruled on another amparo, granting 39 same-sex couples the right to marry. A same-sex couple from San Juan Bautista Tuxtepec won an amparo for same-sex marriage in 2016. The first same-sex marriage in Santiago Jamiltepec took place in April 2018, and Salina Cruz's first same-sex marriage was performed for a lesbian couple the following month. Both marriages were performed after the couples had successfully requested an amparo in court.

Administrative process
On 26 August 2018, the Oaxaca civil registry began allowing same-sex couples to marry without the need of their first obtaining an amparo. However, the process would take three business days compared to two hours for opposite-sex couples. Lawyer Daniel Merlin Tolentino explained that the difference of waiting time between heterosexual and same-sex couples was to "ensure the marriage would comply with jurisprudence". The civil registry would "carefully" consider and analyse each marriage request from same-sex couples to ensure its legitimacy, as state law at the time still banned same-sex marriages. To marry, a couple must present valid documents, including a marriage request, both spouses' birth certificates and official documents and the results of a premarital medical test, as well as have at least 4 witnesses present. The cost is identical to heterosexual couples.

Legislative action
On 28 August 2019, the Congress of Oaxaca passed a bill in a 25–10 vote to make the definition of marriage and concubinage in the Civil Code gender-neutral. The legislation was signed by Governor Alejandro Murat Hinojosa on 29 August, published in the official state journal on 5 October 2019 and came into effect that same day. Article 143 of the Civil Code was amended to read:

 in Spanish: 
 (Marriage is a civil contract between two people, who unite to establish a community of life and to provide each other with respect, equality and mutual aid.)

Marriage statistics
The civil registry of Oaxaca announced in October 2022 that 24 same-sex marriages had been performed in the state in 2021.

Public opinion
A 2017 opinion poll conducted by Gabinete de Comunicación Estratégica found that 43% of Oaxaca residents supported same-sex marriage, while 55% were opposed.

According to a 2018 survey by the National Institute of Statistics and Geography, 52% of the Oaxaca public opposed same-sex marriage.

A 2020 survey conducted by the Center for Social Studies and Public Opinion (CESOP) on 1,400 respondents showed that 62% of Oaxacans were opposed to same-sex marriage, while 37% supported and the remaining 1% were undecided. Levels of support varied greatly with age; it was highest among 18–24-year-olds at 61% and 25–34-year-olds at 50%, while among those aged 55 and above 78% were opposed. Attitudes also varied among districts; with support highest in the 8th electoral district (which includes the state capital, Oaxaca City) at 59%, followed by the 6th electoral district (located in the western part of the state, containing municipalities from the Mixteca and Sierra Sur regions) at 58%. Opposition reached 90% in the 5th and 7th electoral districts in the eastern part of the state (containing the entirety of the Istmo Region). Women were also more likely to support same-sex marriage than men.

See also

 Same-sex marriage in Mexico
 LGBT rights in Mexico

Notes

References

Oaxaca
Oaxaca
2012 in LGBT history
2019 in LGBT history